Popovac is a settlement in the Bosnia and Herzegovina, Republika Srpska entity, Čelinac Municipality. In 1991, the village had inhabitants.

Geography

History
Popovac is birthplace  of Radoslav Brđanin, a convicted Bosnian Serb war criminal.  In 2004 he was sentenced to 32 years imprisonment by the International Criminal Tribunal for the Former Yugoslavia for crimes committed during the Bosnian War. The sentence, which he is serving in Denmark, was reduced by two years on appeal in 2008.

Population

References

External links

Villages in Bosnia and Herzegovina
Čelinac